Iglesia de San Pedro (Ese de Calleras) is a church in Asturias, Spain.

See also
Asturian art
Catholic Church in Spain

References

Churches in Asturias